The Banded Alder Borer, Rosalia funebris, is a member of the very diverse family of longhorn beetles.

Appearance
Like many others in the family Cerambycidae, R. funebris has strikingly colored wing covers (elytra). The elytra are dark with three white bands. The thorax (pronotum) is white with a large black spot. The alder borer's antennae are banded white and black. The male's antennae are longer than the body; the female's are shorter. Long and narrow, the body of R. funebris may grow to be .

Distribution
Located along western North America, Alaska through California, Washington and in New Mexico, the banded alder borer may be found in the spring and summer on the bark of alder trees.

The exact reason is unknown, but R. funebris is drawn to recently painted buildings and may be found, in multitudes, resting on the paint.

Larvae
The adult wood-boring beetles lay their eggs in a crevice of the bark on hardwood trees such as Oregon ash, New Mexico willow, and California laurel/Oregon myrtle. From there the larvae bore into the wood. Unlike the oval (in cross-section) tunnels of the Buprestidae larva, larval Cerambycidae tunnels are circular (in cross-section) and will generally go straight for short distances between turns.

Food
Most mature Cerambycidae feed on flowers. The larvae consume wood. Rosalia funebris generally lays its eggs on downed trees rather than living trees, so it is not considered a significant pest.

Sound
When handled or threatened R. funebris makes an audible noise similar to that of a squeaky running shoe, or a hissing sound much like air being let out of a bike tire.

Other Rosalia species
 Rosalia alpina (Linnaeus, 1758) – Rosalia longicorn
 Rosalia batesi Harold, 1877
 Rosalia coelestis Semenov, 1911
 Rosalia houlberti Vuillet, 1911
 Rosalia lameerei Brogn, 1890

References

Compsocerini
Beetles of North America
Beetles described in 1845
Taxa named by Victor Motschulsky